Carlos Aro (22 September 1939 – 16 July 2017) was an Argentine boxer. He competed in the men's featherweight event at the 1960 Summer Olympics. He was also first in the 1959 Pan American Games featherweight class.

References

1939 births
2017 deaths
Argentine male boxers
Olympic boxers of Argentina
Boxers at the 1960 Summer Olympics
Boxers at the 1959 Pan American Games
Pan American Games gold medalists for Argentina
Pan American Games medalists in boxing
Sportspeople from Mendoza, Argentina
Featherweight boxers
Medalists at the 1959 Pan American Games